Reginald Doherty and Harold Nisbet defeated Charles Allen and Roy Allen 3–6, 7–5, 6–4, 6–1 in the All Comers' Final, but the reigning champions Herbert Baddeley and Wilfred Baddeley defeated Doherty and Nisbet 1–6, 3–6, 6–4, 6–2, 6–1 in the challenge round to win the gentlemen's doubles tennis title at the 1896 Wimbledon Championships.

Draw

Challenge round

All Comers'

References

External links

Gentlemen's Doubles
Wimbledon Championship by year – Men's doubles